Richard Henry Stanton (September 9, 1812 – March 20, 1891, born Bob Stanton) was a politician, lawyer, editor and judge from Kentucky. Born in Alexandria, DC, he completed preparatory studies, attended Alexandria Academy, studied law and was admitted to the bar, commencing practice in Maysville, Kentucky in 1835. He was editor of the Maysville Monitor from 1835 to 1842 and served as postmaster of Maysville. He was elected a Democrat to the United States House of Representatives in 1848, serving from 1849 to 1855. There, he served as chairman of the Committee on Public Buildings and Grounds from 1849 to 1853 and of the Committee on Elections from 1853 to 1855. He was unsuccessful for reelection in 1854. Afterwards, Stanton served as a state's attorney from 1858 to 1861.

At the beginning of the Civil War Stanton was arrested and held at Camp Chase in Columbus, Ohio for supporting secession.

Stanton was a delegate to the Democratic National Convention in 1868, whose slogan was "This is a White Man's Country, Let White Men Rule". He was a district judge from 1868 to 1874. He resumed practicing law until his retirement in 1885 and died on March 20, 1891, in Maysville, Kentucky. He was interred there in Maysville Cemetery.

Stanton is credited with naming Washington Territory, later the state of Washington, during an 1853 debate over the territory's preferred name of "Columbia". He argued that the proposed name would easily be confused with the nation's capital, the
District of Columbia. Congress later approved the "Washington" name change and President Millard Fillmore signed the bill into law on March 2, 1853, officially creating the Washington Territory.

He was the brother of the politician Frederick Perry Stanton who served U.S. House from Tennessee and as interim Territorial Governor of Kansas.

References

External links

1812 births
1891 deaths
Kentucky lawyers
Kentucky postmasters
American newspaper editors
Politicians from Alexandria, Virginia
Democratic Party members of the United States House of Representatives from Kentucky
19th-century American journalists
American male journalists
19th-century American male writers
19th-century American politicians
Journalists from Virginia
Lawyers from Alexandria, Virginia
19th-century American lawyers